Lake Strom Thurmond, officially designated J. Strom Thurmond Reservoir at the federal level, and Clarks Hill Lake by the state of Georgia, is a reservoir at the border between Georgia and South Carolina in the Savannah River Basin.

Description

The reservoir was created by the J. Strom Thurmond Dam during 1951 and 1952 by the U.S. Army Corps of Engineers near the confluence of the Little River and the Savannah River. At , it is the third-largest artificial lake east of the Mississippi River, behind the Kentucky Lake on the Tennessee River and Lake Marion on the Santee River. The J. Strom Thurmond Dam is located upstream from Augusta, Georgia.

The Thurmond Lake is one of the Southeast's largest and most popular public recreation lakes. The dam was built by the U.S. Army Corps of Engineers between 1946 and 1954, but the lake was filled during 1951 and 1952 as part of a flood control, hydropower, and navigation project. Its legally authorized purposes now include recreation, water quality, water supply, and fish and wildlife management. Each year, millions of people use the many public parks, marinas, and campgrounds conveniently located around Thurmond Lake for a variety of outdoor recreational experiences, making it one of the 10 most visited Corps lakes in the nation.

Thurmond Lake is a man-made lake bordering Georgia and South Carolina on the Savannah, Broad, and Little Rivers. The entire Thurmond "project" contains 151,000 acres (611 km2) of land and water.

J. Strom Thurmond Lake and Dam is the first Corps of Engineers project to be built in the Savannah River Basin. Hartwell Lake and Dam the second project built in the basin was completed in 1963, and a third project, Richard B. Russell Lake and Dam was completed in 1985. Congress authorized Thurmond Lake in 1944 and construction began in 1946. The project was completed in 1954 at a cost of $79 million.

History
Due to a clerical error in the original Congressional Authorization, the project was officially authorized to build "Clark Hill Dam", creating "Clark Hill Lake", with the "s" at the end of "Clarks" accidentally omitted. The authorization document outlined the plan of development for the basin with authorized purposes of power production, incidental flood control, and navigation. Later, recreation, water quality, water supply, and fish and wildlife management were added as authorized purposes. Twenty-six years after the construction of the dam, both the dam and lake were renamed to "Clarks Hill Dam" and "Clarks Hill Lake", respectively, in legislation sponsored by Strom Thurmond.

The 1966 Flood Control Act authorized the building of Trotters Shoals Lake and Dam on the Savannah River between Clarks Hill Lake and Hartwell Lake. This lake was later renamed to commemorate a late senator from Georgia, Richard B. Russell, who was an important supporter of building dams on the river. This created a movement to rename Clarks Hill Lake after J. Strom Thurmond, the longest-serving senator in US history, who was from Edgefield on the South Carolina side of the lake. This movement gained support due to the senator's popularity in the area, and in 1988 the project was congressionally renamed "J. Strom Thurmond Dam and Lake at Clarks Hill."

Renaming of lake
Until 1987, the lake was called Clarks Hill Lake after the nearby South Carolina town of Clarks Hill named for Augusta businessman John Mulford Clark (1813-1880). (See "Years Gone By: Information on the Origin of the Names Clarks Hill," Reservoirs—Clarks II Subjects, DOC-1991, Georgia Archives, Morrow.) On December 3, 1987, two days before long-time South Carolina Senator Strom Thurmond's 85th birthday, Representative Butler Derrick of South Carolina introduced a bill before Congress to rename the lake after Thurmond.

The bill quickly passed through Congress and was signed into law by President Ronald Reagan on December 23, 1987. Many residents of both states were upset by the sudden change of name of the lake and the dam, which had not been open to public comment. In response, a group of Georgia legislators, led by Representative Doug Barnard, Jr. (who was the only Georgia co-sponsor of the original 1987 bill) introduced a federal bill to rename the lake as "Clarks Hill" once again. That bill, however, was unsuccessful, and the name remained unchanged.

On April 4, 1989, the State of Georgia legislature passed House Resolution No. 115 making "Clarks Hill" the official state name for both the dam and associated reservoir. Accordingly, Georgia's state map still refers to the lake as Clarks Hill. Many residents of Georgia as well as South Carolina still refer to the lake by its original name.

See also

 List of dams and reservoirs in Georgia
 List of dams and reservoirs in South Carolina

References

External links

 Great Lakes of Georgia: Clarks Hill
 Savannah Water Control Home page
 J.H. Dent Farm - Savannah River Project
J Strom Thurmond Reservoir Bathymetric Map

Protected areas of Columbia County, Georgia
Protected areas of Lincoln County, Georgia
Protected areas of McCormick County, South Carolina
Protected areas of McDuffie County, Georgia
Protected areas of Wilkes County, Georgia
Strom
Strom
Bodies of water of Columbia County, Georgia
Bodies of water of Lincoln County, Georgia
Bodies of water of McCormick County, South Carolina
Bodies of water of McDuffie County, Georgia
Bodies of water of Wilkes County, Georgia